Grenada competed at the 2000 Summer Olympics in Sydney, Australia with two track and field athletes and one swimmer.

Results by event

Athletics
Men's 400m
Rudieon Sylvan
 Round 1 – 48.17 (did not advance)

Women's 400m
Hazel-Ann Regis
 Round 1 – 55.11 (did not advance)

Swimming
Men's 50m Freestyle
Omar Hughes
 Preliminary Heat – 25.05 (did not advance)

See also
Grenada at the 1999 Pan American Games

References

Wallechinsky, David (2004). The Complete Book of the Summer Olympics (Athens 2004 Edition). Toronto, Canada. . 
International Olympic Committee (2001). The Results. Retrieved 12 November 2005.
Sydney Organising Committee for the Olympic Games (2001). Official Report of the XXVII Olympiad Volume 1: Preparing for the Games. Retrieved 20 November 2005.
Sydney Organising Committee for the Olympic Games (2001). Official Report of the XXVII Olympiad Volume 2: Celebrating the Games. Retrieved 20 November 2005.
Sydney Organising Committee for the Olympic Games (2001). The Results. Retrieved 20 November 2005.
International Olympic Committee Web Site
sports-reference

Nations at the 2000 Summer Olympics
2000
Summer Olympics